Bengt Ingemar Samuelsson (born 21 May 1934) is a Swedish biochemist. He shared with Sune K. Bergström and John R. Vane the 1982 Nobel Prize for Physiology or Medicine for discoveries concerning prostaglandins and related substances.

Education and early life
He was born in Halmstad in southwest Sweden and studied at Stockholm University, where he became a professor in 1967.

Research and career
Discussing the role of prostaglandins in the body, Samuelsson explained, "It's a control system for the cells that participates in many biological functions. There are endless possibilities of manipulating this system in drug development."

His research interests were originally in cholesterol metabolism with importance to reaction mechanisms. Following the structural work on prostaglandins along with Sune Bergström he was interested mainly in the transformation products of arachidonic acid. This has led to the identification 
of endoperoxides, thromboxanes and the leukotrienes, and his group has chiefly been involved in studying the chemistry, biochemistry and biology of these compounds and their function in biological control systems. This research has implications in numerous clinical areas, especially in thrombosis, inflammation, and allergy.

This field has grown enormously since those days. Between 1981 and 1995 about three thousand papers per year were published that specifically used the expression "prostaglandins," or related terms such as "prostacyclins," "leukotrienes," and "thromboxanes," in their labels and titles.

Bengt Samuelsson has served as a director on the boards of  Pharmacia AB,  NicOx SA and Schering AG and is an advisor to the venture capital fund HealthCap.

Awards and honors
In 1975, he was awarded the Louisa Gross Horwitz Prize from Columbia University together with Sune K. Bergström. He was elected a Foreign Member of the Royal Society (ForMemRS) in 1990.

References

External links
  including the Nobel Lecture From Studies of Biochemical Mechanisms to Novel Biological Mediators: Prostaglandin Endoperoxides, Thromboxanes and Leukotrienes

1934 births
Living people
Foreign associates of the National Academy of Sciences
Swedish biochemists
Stockholm University alumni
Academic staff of the Karolinska Institute
Nobel laureates in Physiology or Medicine
Swedish Nobel laureates
Foreign Members of the Royal Society
People from Halmstad
Members of the French Academy of Sciences
Recipients of the Albert Lasker Award for Basic Medical Research
Members of the National Academy of Medicine
Members of the Royal Swedish Academy of Sciences